Hovnanadzor (also romanized as Ovnanadzor; also, Ovandara) is a town in the Lori Province of Armenia.

References 

Populated places in Lori Province